David B. Jones (1848 – August 23, 1923) was president and chairman of the board of directors of the Mineral Point Zinc Company and considered a founder of the Zinc industry in America. When ill, he chartered a special train whose speed rivaled the time of the Scott Special.

Biography 

"He founded the Mineral Point [Zinc] Company in Wisconsin, which owns the whole town in Wisconsin, about thirty years ago and merged it with the New Jersey Zinc Company in a nationwide organization in 1897."

David Benton Jones had a winter home near Santa Barbara, California, at "Pepper Hill" in Montecito, California.
He had a townhouse at 1435 Astor Street in Chicago, Illinois, and a summer house at Lake Forest, Illinois. When he was ill, he chartered a train between Los Angeles, Chicago, and Lake Forest which was a few minutes faster than the Scott Special. David B. Jones also had a house in Florida.

"Mr. Jones was born in Pembrokeshire, North Wales, in 1848. He came to this country as a boy and received his education here, graduating from Princeton University in 1874. He was a close friend of ex-President Wilson."

David B. Jones had three daughters: Gwethalyn Jones,  Catherine (Mrs. Edward H. Bennett) Jones, and Winifred Jones  and two sons: Owen B. and Herbert Jones.

References

Additional sources

See also 

1848 births
1923 deaths
19th-century American businesspeople